Thiago Paulino dos Santos (born 29 December 1985) is a Brazilian Paralympic athlete. He won the bronze medal in the men's shot put F57 event at the 2020 Summer Paralympics in Tokyo, Japan. At the time, he won the gold medal with a throw of 15.10 metres but after some of his throws were ruled invalid, he dropped to third place.

References

Living people
1985 births
Sportspeople from São Paulo (state)
Brazilian male discus throwers
Brazilian male shot putters
Paralympic athletes of Brazil
Athletes (track and field) at the 2020 Summer Paralympics
Medalists at the 2020 Summer Paralympics
Paralympic bronze medalists for Brazil
Paralympic medalists in athletics (track and field)
Medalists at the World Para Athletics Championships
Medalists at the 2015 Parapan American Games
Medalists at the 2019 Parapan American Games
21st-century Brazilian people
People from Orlândia